Abdul Khaliq Masood Ahmed  (Arabic: عبد الخالق مسعود أحمد) (born 21 January 1955) is the former president of the Iraq Football Association. He served as the financial secretary of the federation when Hussein Saeed was president from 2004 to 2011. He was the vice president of the Iraqi Football Association under Najeh Humoud from 2011 to 2014 and then, in May 2014, he was able to excel in the elections of the Football Association and become President. He previously served as Vice President of Erbil SC.

References

External links
 official website of Iraq Football Association

1955 births
Living people
Iraqi football chairmen and investors
People from Erbil